Don't Mess wit Texas is the debut studio album by American rapper Lil' Keke from Houston, Texas. It was released on June 17, 1997 via Jam Down Records. It was reissued in 2004 by another Houston-based record label Rap Classics. There is also a chopped and screwed version available with a different cover.

The album peaked at #43 on the Top R&B/Hip-Hop Albums in US Billboard charts and spawned a hit single "Southside".

Track listing

Sample credits
"Something About the Southside" contains elements from "Let's Ride" by Richie Rich
"Serious Smoke" contains elements from "Love's Train" by Con Funk Shun
"Southside" contains elements from "Friends" by Whodini
"Bounce and Turn" contains elements from "Turn Your Love Around" by George Benson
"If You Wanna" contains elements from "Float On" by The Floaters

Personnel
Marcus Lakee Edwards – main artist
Christopher "Duke" Bridges – featured artist (tracks: 5, 6, 12)
Luke Bridges – featured artist (tracks: 5, 7, 12)
Archie "Lee" Harris – featured artist (tracks: 5, 12)
C. Huey – featured artist (tracks: 2, 9)
Ben Thompson – featured artist (track 2)
Christopher Barriere – featured artist (track 4)
Kenneth Moore – featured artist (track 6)
Michael Dixon – featured artist (track 6)
N. Randall – featured artist (track 7)
André Sargent – featured artist (track 11), producer (tracks: 5, 6, 8, 10-13)
Albert Davis – featured artist (track 13)
Patrick Hawkins – featured artist (track 13)
Sean Jemison – producer (tracks: 1-4, 7, 9, 14, 15)
Mark Kidney – engineering & mixing
John Moran – mastering
Patrick Lewis – executive producer
Vincent Perry – executive producer

Charts

References

External links

1997 debut albums
Lil' Keke albums